Baimashania is a genus of flowering plants belonging to the family Brassicaceae.

Its native range is China.

Species:

Baimashania pulvinata 
Baimashania wangii

References

Brassicaceae
Brassicaceae genera